Summer Nightastic! was a seasonal event from Walt Disney Parks and Resorts, celebrating summer at Disneyland Resort and Walt Disney World. It was announced and started in 2009 at Disneyland Resort and had returned the next year, with the introduction at the Walt Disney World Resort. The event included special nighttime events and ride operations. Disneyland Resort featured events at Disneyland and Disney California Adventure, while at Walt Disney World, events were featured at Magic Kingdom, Epcot and Disney's Hollywood Studios. The event was replaced by Disney Soundsational Summer at Disneyland, however the fireworks were retained. The event did not return to Walt Disney World.

Walt Disney World Resort

Magic Kingdom
 Main Street Electrical Parade (2010)
 Unnamed Summer Nightastic Firework Spectacular (2010)

Disney's Hollywood Studios
 The Twilight Zone Tower of Terror Re-Imagined (2010)
 Rock 'n' Glow Dance Party (2010)
 Fantasmic!

Epcot
 Sounds Like Summer Concert Series (2010)
 Captain EO Tribute (2010)

Disneyland Resort

Disneyland
 Magical (2009–2010)
 Fantasmic! (2009–2010)
 TLT Dance Club (2009–2010)
 Pixie Hollow (2009–2010)
 Captain EO Tribute (2010)

Disney California Adventure
 World of Color premiered (2010)
 Toy Story Mania (2010)
 Disney's Aladdin: A Musical Spectacular (2010)
 Glow Fest (2009–2010)

References

 http://thedisneyblog.com/2009/04/27/disneyland-is-summer-nightastic/
 http://disneyworld.disney.go.com/entertainment/summer-nightastic/
 https://web.archive.org/web/20100620193855/http://disneyland.disney.go.com/disneyland/en_US/special/summer/index?name=Summer

Events at Walt Disney World
Disneyland Resort
Walt Disney Parks and Resorts
Amusement park attractions introduced in 2010
Amusement park attractions that closed in 2010
Former Walt Disney Parks and Resorts attractions